Eladocagene exuparvovec, sold under the brand name Upstaza, is a gene therapy product for the treatment of aromatic L‑amino acid decarboxylase (AADC) deficiency. It infuses the gene encoding for the human AADC enzyme into the putamen region of the brain. The subsequent expression of AADC results in dopamine production and, as a result, development of motor function in patients with AADC deficiency.

The most common side effects include initial insomnia, irritability and dyskinesia.

Eladocagene exuparvovec was approved for medical use in the European Union in July 2022.

Medical uses 
Eladocagene exuparvovec is indicated for the treatment of aromatic L-amino acid decarboxylase (AADC) deficiency.

Society and culture 
Eladocagene exuparvovec is the international nonproprietary name (INN).

Legal status 
On 19 May 2022, the Committee for Medicinal Products for Human Use (CHMP) of the European Medicines Agency (EMA) adopted a positive opinion, recommending the granting of a marketing authorization under exceptional circumstances for the medicinal product Upstaza, intended for the treatment of aromatic L‑amino acid decarboxylase (AADC) deficiency. As Upstaza is an advanced therapy medicinal product, the CHMP positive opinion is based on an assessment by the Committee for Advanced Therapies. The applicant for this medicinal product is PTC Therapeutics International Limited. Eladocagene exuparvovec was approved for medical use in the European Union in July 2022.

Figures

References

Further reading

External links 
 

Drugs that are a gene therapy
Gene therapy
Orphan drugs